Miss Liberia is a national Beauty pageant in Liberia.

History
Miss Liberia pageant was held for first time in 1962. The pageant is sponsored by Ministry of Information, Culture and Tourism (MICAT). Traditionally, the winner will represent Liberia at Miss World pageant. In 1974 - 1977 the winner represented the country at Miss Universe pageant. This pageant is unrelated to Miss Liberia U.S.A pageant.

Organizers
In 2012 Cellcom GSM Company has promised to sponsor the communication aspect of this year's Miss Liberia Beauty Pageant expected to be hosted by CT. Com Liberia Incorporated. The organizers of the pageant have budgeted a little over US$98,000 for the program. Cellcom has promised to contribute US$22,000 to the budget for publicity. The GSM Company says it believes in the improvement of any Liberian, who believes in achieving results for the benefit of all Liberians. After absent at the beauty contest, Miss Liberia is back in 2014. The Steering Committee of the Miss Liberia Beauty Pageant has announced 11 stripes Incorporated as the company to organize the prestigious Miss Liberia 2013/2014 beauty pageant in Monrovia.

Titleholders

Liberia at International pageants

Miss Universe Liberia

Miss World Liberia

Miss International Liberia

References

Liberia
Recurring events established in 1962
Liberian awards
Entertainment events in Liberia
Liberia